Lizard Head Pass, elevation , is a mountain pass in the San Juan Mountains of Colorado, on the border between Dolores and San Miguel counties.

It is also on the divide between the watersheds of the Dolores River and San Miguel River. The pass lies in the saddle between Lizard Head and Sheep Mountain.

History
The pass is named for a prominent nearby peak that is said to look like the head of a lizard, the  spire of Lizard Head. The pass is currently traversed by State Highway 145, about 12 miles south of the Telluride turnoff.

It was also used by the historic Rio Grande Southern Railroad until 1952. Although the grades on both sides of the pass are mild for automobile traffic, this was a significant obstacle for the railroad, and this was a factor leading to the use of the Galloping Goose railcars.

See also

References

External links

Mountain passes of Colorado
Landforms of Dolores County, Colorado
Landforms of San Miguel County, Colorado
San Juan Mountains (Colorado)
Rail mountain passes of the United States